Pontpoint is a commune in the Oise department in northern France.

See also
 Communes of the Oise department

References

External links

 Official Web site
 Association pour la Sauvegarde du Patrimoine Communal de Pontpoint
 Communauté de communes des Pays d'Oise et d'Halatte

Communes of Oise